The Highlight routine competition at the 2019 World Aquatics Championships was held on 15 July 2019.

Results
The final was started at 19:00.

References

Team highlight routine